The Type 97 motorcycle, or Rikuo, was a copy of a Harley-Davidson motorcycle produced with a sidecar from 1935 in Japan under license from Harley-Davidson by the Sankyo Company (later Rikuo Nainen Company). Some 18,000 of the machines were used by the Imperial Japanese forces during World War II.

In the years after World War I, Harley-Davidson's US sales declined while dozens of US motorcycle brands went under, primarily as a result of the decline in the price of the Ford Model T car, triggering a national shift from motorcycles to cars for cheap transportation. Harley-Davidson sought to make up the lost sales abroad and was selling 2,000 units per year in Japan by the middle of the 1920s. In 1932 Harley-Davidson licensed Sankyo Trading Company to build complete motorcycles in Japan, under the name Rikuo, which meant King of the Road.

See also
Kurogane Type 95
List of motorcycles of the 1940s
List of motorcycles of the 1950s

References

External links
Rikuo Type 97 Vladivostok Oldtimers Museum photos

Motorcycles of Japan
World War II vehicles of Japan
Military motorcycles
Motorcycles introduced in the 1930s